David Karubanga, is a Ugandan politician. He is the State Minister of Public Service in the Ugandan Cabinet. He was appointed to that position on 6 June 2016. He also served as the representative of Kigorobya County Constituency, in Hoima District, in the 10th Ugandan Parliament (2016 - 2021).. In 2021 he was elected to the same position.

See also
 Cabinet of Uganda
 Parliament of Uganda

References

Living people
Hoima District
Members of the Parliament of Uganda
Government ministers of Uganda
People from Western Region, Uganda
Year of birth missing (living people)
National Resistance Movement politicians
21st-century Ugandan politicians